NGC 347 is a spiral galaxy in the constellation Cetus. It was discovered on September 27, 1864, by Albert Marth. It was described by Dreyer as "very faint, very small."

References

External links
 

0347
18640927
Cetus (constellation)
Spiral galaxies
003673